Under the Southern Cross may refer to:
 Films
 Under the Southern Cross (1927 film), a British film
 Under the Southern Cross (1929 film), an American film
 Under the Southern Cross (1938 film), an Italian film directed by Guido Brignone

 Songs
 Under the Southern Cross I Stand  is the victory song of the Australian cricket team.